Beisu could refer to these towns in China:

 Beisu, Hebei (北苏), in Wuji County, Hebei
 Beisu, Shandong (北宿), in Zoucheng, Shandong